Iguatemi is a municipality located in the Brazilian state of Mato Grosso do Sul. Its population was 16,176 (2020) and its area is 2,947 km2.

References

Municipalities in Mato Grosso do Sul